Sir William Hawkins (fl. c. 1600) was a representative of the English East India Company notable for being the commander of Hector, the first company ship to anchor at Surat in India on 24 August 1608. Hawkins travelled to Agra to negotiate consent for a factory from Emperor Jahangir in 1609.

Life and career
The eldest son of William Hawkins or Hawkyns (died 1589) and nephew of John Hawkins (1532–1595), he served in Francis Drake's voyage to the South Sea in 1577, presumably in the Elizabeth with John Wynter, though possibly in the Golden Hind with Drake himself. In October 1581 he was nominated, apparently at the request of his uncle, then treasurer of the navy, as lieutenant to Edward Fenton, appointed to command an expedition for the East Indies and China, which sailed from England in May 1582. Notwithstanding the connection between Fenton and John Hawkyns, who had married sisters, there was from the first a bad feeling between him and William Hawkyns, arising partly no doubt out of jealousy of the claims which had been put forward on behalf of young Hawkyns to command the expedition over Fenton's head; partly also, it may be, out of the insolent and insubordinate conduct of Hawkyns himself; the feeling was doubtless intensified by the formal instruction to Fenton not to remove him "but upon just cause duly proved and by consent of your assistants". When the little fleet was sailing from Plymouth, Hawkyns was still onshore, and Fenton put to sea without him; he was brought out in the Francis, one of the squadron, and put on board his ship, the Leicester. Throughout the voyage, the captain and the lieutenant seem to have quarreled and thwarted each other on every occasion, and the Leicester finally arrived in the Thames with Hawkyns in irons. It does not appear that John Hawkyns gave his nephew any support in this quarrel; for five years afterward, he was on terms of confidential friendship with Fenton.

Hawkyns may probably be identified with the William Hawkyns who, in 1587, commanded the Advice on the coast of Ireland; and again with the William Hawkyns who, in 1588, commanded the Griffin against the Spanish Armada. It has been suggested that the commander of the Griffin was his father, then-mayor of Plymouth; but this is impossible, for on 19 July the Griffin was at sea with Sir Francis Drake, and the mayor of Plymouth was onshore collecting reinforcements. Hawkins was, however, not an uncommon Devonshire name, and it is quite possible that the commander of the Advice or Griffin belonged to some other family.

By his father's will in 1589 Hawkins inherited an annuity of £40. His uncle, Sir John Hawkyns, left him by will in 1595, besides a share of the prospective profits of the last fatal voyage to the West Indies, £10 a year to be paid quarterly, "on condition that he does not alienate nor sell the same annuity nor rent-charge, or any part thereof, for otherwise, this gift shall be void." He left also legacies of £100 to each of Hawkyns's children, to be payable "to every such child at the time of their marriage, or at the accomplishment of their several ages of eighteen years, which shall first happen." From the wording of this clause, it would seem probable that the children were girls; but we know nothing more of them.

Nor do we certainly know anything more of Hawkyns himself, though he has been identified with the man of the same name who in 1607 commanded the East India Company's ship Hector on a voyage to Surat with William Keeling, and was charged with "his Majestys letters and presents to the princes and governors of Cambay, on account of his experience and language". This William Hawkyns, on arriving at Surat, proceeded accordingly to Agra and the court of the Mughal Jahangir, which he reached in April 1609, and where he remained for nearly three years. According to the account given in his Journal, the emperor took much pleasure in his conversation, and detained him, assigning him handsome maintenance, estimated at upwards of £3,000 a year, his serious occupation being to combat the intrigues of the Portuguese and to endeavor to obtain formal permission for the establishment of an English factory at Surat. His favor with the emperor enabled him to overcome all difficulties, and the required license was given; it was the first distinct recognition of English commerce in the East. Jahangir was desirous of attaching him to the country and his interests and pressed him to marry a maid out of the palace. Such a wife could also ensure that his food was not poisoned since Jahangir had already told the Jesuits that if Hawkins "dyed by an extraordinary casualtie, they should rue for it." Hawkins consented to the match, conditionally on her not being a Moor, and accordingly he took as his wife the daughter of an Armenian Christian. 

Around the end of 1610, William Hawkins, instructed one of his fellow merchants, William Finch, to travel about 80 km southwest from Agra to Bayana, a town well known for its high-quality indigo production. At this time, one of the ships of Wali Nimat Mariam-uz-Zamani's, Queen Mother of Mughal Empire, was being equipped for a voyage to Mocha. An agent had consequently been sent on her behalf to procure indigo, presumably an important part of the royal cargo. But just as the deal was being concluded, Finch swooped in with a higher bid, an infraction no Indian would have dared to commit knowing her social standing, and made away with the indigo the queen mother had reserved. An insult to the Queen Mother was an insult to the emperor himself, while Finch was long on his way out of Bayana by this time, his boss, Hawkins, already in trouble with Jahangir for other reasons, had to suffer consequences. She exerted enough pressure on her son to ensure that William Hawkins, the “English Khan" who till then was friendly with Jahangir, had to pack his bags and leave for good. He left Agra in November 1611, and three months later arrived at Surat, where he found Sir Henry Middleton, with whom he went to the Red Sea, and afterward to Java. At Bantam he went on board the Thomas, part of the fleet under the overall command of John Saris, and in her sailed for England. She touched at the Cape of Good Hope in April 1613, and on the passage home, probably near the end of it, Hawkyns died. His remains were brought to Ireland and buried there. 

This Hawkyns was certainly a man of superior ability and rendered valuable service to English commerce in procuring its formal recognition at Surat. But his identification with the nephew of Sir John Hawkyns is very unsatisfactory. It is not based on any evidence; and, indeed, what little evidence there is seems to point the opposite way. Fenton's lieutenant, if only because of his name and family, was a man of some consequence, and it is difficult to conceive that he could have been to the West Indies, or have gained experience in the East without any record remaining. Fenton's lieutenant had not a brother Charles, nor yet brothers Giles or Roger; the Mughal's friend seems to have had all three. A good deal was said in 1614 about the inheritance of the widow of Captain Hawkyns who died, apparently intestate, onboard the Thomas, but nothing was claimed for any daughters by a former marriage. Another point is this: when, on the passage out in 1607, Captain Keeling called a council to consider the advisability of touching at Sierra Leone, it was resolved to do so, because "Sir Francis Drake and Captain Cavendish had made a favorable report" of it; but not a word was said about the much greater experience and knowledge of Sir John Hawkyns. All of which tends to the conclusion that the Hawkyns of East Indian distinction was not the son and grandson of the mayors of Plymouth.

Personal life
Hawkins married Mariam Khan, who was the daughter of an influential merchant in the court of the Mughal Emperor Akbar and Jahangir by whom he does not seem to have had an issue. The year after Hawkins's death, Mariam married Captain Gabriel Towerson and with him returned to India. Towerson abandoned her and returned to England in 1619 before resettling in Amboyna. Despite appealing to the EIC for maintenance, she received nothing and on Towerson's death his assets were awarded to his brother.

References

Attribution

British East India Company people